The Tŏkhyŏn Line is a non-electrified standard-gauge secondary line of the Korean State Railway in North P'yŏngan Province, North Korea, running from South Sinŭiju on the P'yŏngŭi Line to Tŏkhyŏn.

History
The Tŏkhyŏn Line was opened by the Korean State Railway in April 1971.

Services
The primary function of the Tŏkhyŏn Line is to deliver iron ore from the mines around Tŏkhyŏn to the September Iron & Steel Complex (9월제철종합기업소) in Sinŭiju and the Hwanghae Iron & Steel Complex on the Songrim Line, thus the bulk of southbound freight is ore from the mines.

Three pairs of commuter trains run on the line between Sinŭiju Ch'ŏngnyŏn and Tŏkhyŏn stations.

Route

A yellow background in the "Distance" box indicates that section of the line is not electrified.

References

Railway lines in North Korea
Standard gauge railways in North Korea